John Gardner (born 30 January 1969), known professionally as Akshay Anand is an Indian actor who appears mainly in Hindi films and television.

Early life and career
Anand was born as John Gardner and he assumed the name Akshay inspired by his character in his television debut Indradhanush. The name Anand had been given to him by his mentor, actor and director Dev Anand, during his association with Dev Anand while filming Hum Naujawan. He studied economics at St. Xavier's College, Mumbai before getting into acting.

His television debut was made in 1989 with the 13-episode TV series Indradhanush which was based on time travel.

He also mentors at his acting academy, Akshay Anand Acting Academy. He is also active as producer and director for various web series under the banner Akshay Anand Academy Production.

Filmography

Selected films

Television

References

External links
 

Living people
Male actors in Malayalam cinema
Indian male film actors
Male actors in Hindi cinema
20th-century Indian male actors
21st-century Indian male actors
1957 births
Actors from Mumbai